Seipsville Hotel, also known as Seip's Hotel, Seip's Tavern, and Seipsville Rib House, is a historic inn and tavern located at Palmer Township in Northampton County, Pennsylvania, United States. The hotel was built in 1760 and is a 2 1/2 story, 4 bay fieldstone building with an adjoining 1 1/2-story spring house.  

The hotel has a gable roof with two gable end brick chimneys.  In addition to being an inn and tavern, the building houses a post office, polling place, and community meeting center. It is now operated as a bed and breakfast known as the Seipsville Inn.

It was added to the National Register of Historic Places in 1977.

Gallery

References

Hotel buildings completed in 1760
Hotel buildings on the National Register of Historic Places in Pennsylvania
Buildings and structures in Northampton County, Pennsylvania
Bed and breakfasts in Pennsylvania
National Register of Historic Places in Northampton County, Pennsylvania